Smeloye is a rural locality (a selo) and the administrative center of Smelovsky Selsoviet of Oktyabrsky District, Amur Oblast, Russia. The population was 128 as of 2018. There are 14 streets.

Geography 
Smeloye is located 30 km northeast of Yekaterinoslavka (the district's administrative centre) by road. Yasnaya Polyana is the nearest rural locality.

References 

Rural localities in Oktyabrsky District, Amur Oblast